Steel Aréna – Košický štadión L. Trojáka (English: Steel Arena – Ladislav Troják Stadium in Košice) is the home arena of the ice hockey club HC Košice. Its capacity is 8,343.

The arena opened on February 24, 2006, and was named in honor of the general sponsor of the club, U. S. Steel Košice (a member of the United States Steel Corporation) and also in honor of Ladislav Troják, a Košice-born hockey player who was the first Slovak to win the World Championship with the Czechoslovakian national team.

Notable events

Sport
An overview of some sport events:

2007
2007 The nine-pin bowling World Championships

2008
2008 European Junior Wrestling Championships

2009
2009 World Championship in Bodybuilding

2011
2011 IIHF World Championship

2019
2019 IIHF World Championship
2019 ISBHF Ball Hockey World Championship

2021
2021 JGP Slovakia

2022
2022 European Men's Handball Championship

Music

Transport
Steel Arena is located near the historical center of Košice, near Štúrova Street.

The arena includes a parking deck with space for 496 cars. An additional 524 parking spaces are available at the OC Galeria shopping center, approximately 500 m away.

Gallery

References

External links

 

Sports venues completed in 2006
Buildings and structures in Košice
Indoor arenas in Slovakia
Indoor ice hockey venues in Slovakia
21st-century architecture in Slovakia
2006 establishments in Slovakia
Sport in Košice